Sick Bricks is an American animated short series that is an acquired series for Cartoon Network.

Plot
The series is based the video game of the same name owned by Spin Master:
Sick City is under attack by a villain name Overlord Omega, who wants to rid the cities weirdness so he can take it over "normally." Jack Justice must recruit all of his friends and allies to stop him and his Omega Goons.

Episodes list
Sick Bricks has only had one season, which included twenty episodes.

Season 1
There were 20 episodes released in Season 1. All of them being on Cartoon Network's Website.

References

External links
 

2015 American television series debuts